Mana Telangana is a registered Telugu language newspaper in the Indian State of Telangana.
It is published simultaneously from  Nizamabad, Karimnagar, Warangal, Khammam, Nalgonda, Hyderabad and Mahbubnagar.

The paper is also available in epaper format.

See also
 List of newspapers in India
 List of newspapers in India by circulation
 List of newspapers in the world by circulation

References

External links

Daily newspapers published in India
Telugu-language newspapers
Newspapers published in Hyderabad
Publications established in 2015
2015 establishments in Telangana